Wilbur John "Bill" Sortet  (June 25, 1912January 22, 1998) was an American gridiron football end who played eight seasons in the National Football League for the Pittsburgh Pirates/Steelers. Sortet attended West Virginia University.

A 1939 official program for a Pirates intra-squad game shows Sortet's position as "R.G." and weighing 190 lbs.

External links
Career stats

1912 births
1998 deaths
People from Vincennes, Indiana
Players of American football from Indiana
American football wide receivers
West Virginia Mountaineers football players
Pittsburgh Pirates (football) players
Pittsburgh Steelers players